The Philological Quarterly is a peer-reviewed academic journal covering research on medieval European and modern literature and culture. It was established in 1922 by Hardin Craig. The inaugural issue of the journal was made available at sixty cents per copy and included articles on Chaucer, Henry Fielding, and Shakespeare, among others. Berthold Ullman served with three colleagues on the original board of associate editors. Bill Kupersmith guided the journal through disciplinary reorganizations and changing academic norms during his thirty-year service as editor of the journal.

The current editor-in-chief is Eric Gidal.

References

External links 
 

Publications established in 1922
Quarterly journals
University of Iowa
English-language journals
1922 establishments in Iowa
Philology journals
Medieval studies literature